Dycer may refer to:

List of aircraft (D)#Dycer
Dycer baronets